Goldner is a surname. Notable people with the surname include:

Brian Goldner (1963–2021), the chief executive officer of the American toy company Hasbro
Charles Goldner, Austrian-born actor who appeared in a number of British films during the 1940s and 1950s
Diane Goldner (born 1956), actress, best known for her roles in her husband, John Gulager's film series Feast
George Goldner (1918–1970), American record label owner and promoter
Janet Goldner (born 1952), American artist
Justin Goldner, American record producer and musician
Richard Goldner (1908–1991), Romanian-born, Viennese-trained Australian violist, pedagogue and inventor
Stephanie Goldner (1896–1962), Austrian American harpist and the first female member of the New York Philharmonic in 1922
Vladimir Goldner (born 1933), Croatian physician, academic and professor

See also
Goldner–Harary graph, simple undirected graph with 11 vertices and 27 edges
Goldner String Quartet, Australian string quartet formed in 1995 in honour of Richard Goldner, the founder of Musica Viva Australia